The Júma are an indigenous people of Brazil, who lived in the Terra Indígena Juma in the Amazonas, along the Mucuim River, a tributary of Rio Açuã.

Name
The Júma are also known as Kagwahibm, Kagwahiph, Kagwahiv, Kavahiva, Kawahip, Kawaib, and Yumá people.

Population
In the 18th century, the Juma numbered between 12,000–15,000 people. The Juma numbered 300 in 1940. In 1998, there were only four Juma people.. As of 2021, there are 17 descendants of Aruká's, the last elder Juma member, who died from COVID-19 in 2021 in Porto Velho. He was survived by his three daughters and grandchildren.

Language
The Júma people spoke one of the nine varieties of the Kagwahiva language, which belongs to Subgroup VI of the Tupi-Guarani languages. The last native speaker, called Aruka Juma, died in 2021. Furthermore, the language has been documented since 2019 through the recording of vocabulary lists, traditional narratives, everyday stories, etc. Some of the texts can accessed through the website of the Survey of California and Other Indian Languages.

Notes

Ethnic groups in Brazil
Indigenous peoples in Brazil
Indigenous peoples of the Amazon
Extinct ethnic groups